Lindel O. Hume is a former Democratic member of the Indiana Senate, serving from 1982 until his retirement in 2014. He also previously served eight terms in the Indiana House of Representatives from 1974 through 1982.

Education
Lindel Hume received his education from the following institutions:
 BS, Mathematics and Physics, Oakland City University, 1969
 Electric Technician, Teletronic Technical Institute, 1963
 Attended, MBA studies, University of Evansville

Political experience
Lindel Hume has had the following political experience:
 Senate Minority Whip, Indiana State Senate, 1984, 2008–2014
 Senator, Indiana State Senate, 1982–2014
 Precinct Committeeman, 1968–1976, present
 Representative, Indiana State House of Representatives, 1974–1982

References

External links
 State Senator Lindel Hume official Indiana State Legislature site

 

Democratic Party Indiana state senators
Democratic Party members of the Indiana House of Representatives
1942 births
Living people
Oakland City University alumni
People from Pike County, Indiana
People from Princeton, Indiana